Mill Spring may refer to:

Mill Spring, Missouri, a village in Wayne County
Mill Spring, North Carolina, an unincorporated community in Polk County

See also
Spring Mill (disambiguation)
Spring Mills (disambiguation)
Battle of Mill Springs